Turbo jonathani is a species of sea snail, a marine gastropod mollusk in the family Turbinidae, the turban snails.

 Taxonomic status: Some authors place the name in the subgenus Turbo (Marmarostoma)

Description
The length of the shell varies between 50 mm and 65 mm.

Distribution
This marine species occurs off Tanzania and Oman.

References
Notes

Sources
 Alf A. & Kreipl K. (2003). A Conchological Iconography: The Family Turbinidae, Subfamily Turbininae, Genus Turbo. Conchbooks, Hackenheim Germany.
 Williams, S.T. (2007). Origins and diversification of Indo-West Pacific marine fauna: evolutionary history and biogeography of turban shells (Gastropoda, Turbinidae). Biological Journal of the Linnean Society, 2007, 92, 573–592.

External links
 

jonathani
Gastropods described in 1992